Yanne Kouomou Chembo is an Electrical Engineer and Associate Professor at the University of Maryland, College Park. His research considers ultra-pure microwaves and Kerr frequency combs. He is a Fellow of The Optical Society and SPIE.

Early life and education 
Chembo was born in Cameroon. He attended the University of Yaoundé I where he earned two bachelor's degrees, one in physics and one in telecommunications engineering. Chembo completed two simultaneous doctoral degrees, one at the University of Yaoundé I and one at the University of the Balearic Islands. After earning his doctoral degree, Chembo moved to the French National Centre for Scientific Research (CNRS) FEMTO-ST Institute as a postdoctoral researcher. He joined the Jet Propulsion Laboratory in 2009.

Research and career 
Chembo returned to the FEMTO-ST Institute in 2010, where he led a group working on microwave photonics. Here Chembo looked to develop ultra-pure microwaves using optical resonators. He was supported by the European Research Council. He created a photonic module that was capable of generating high-purity microwave signals for aerospace and optical communications. To allow for coherent optical fibre telecommunications, Chembo made use of Kerr frequency combs.

In 2014 Chembo was appointed to the International Commission for Optics committee on regional development.

He stayed in France until 2016, when he moved to the joint Georgia Tech – CNRS Joint International Laboratory. He moved to the University of Maryland, College Park in 2019, where he was made Associate Professor of Electrical Engineering. He holds a joint position at the Institute for Research in Electronics and Applied Physics (IREAP).

He is an Associate Editor for Optics Express and has helped with the organisation of the International Year of Light.

Awards and honors 

 2019 Fellow of SPIE "for his achievements in ultra-stable microwave photonics oscillators."
 2020 Fellow of The Optical Society "For pioneering contributions to the development of microwave photonic systems for aerospace and communication engineering, including monolithic optical frequency comb generators and optoelectronic oscillators."

Select publications

References 

Living people
Year of birth missing (living people)
Cameroonian scientists
Cameroonian academics
University of Maryland, College Park faculty
African-American scientists
Fellows of SPIE
Fellows of Optica (society)
21st-century African-American people